A colonist is a settler, a person who has migrated to an area and established a permanent residence there, often to colonize the area.

Colonist can also refer to:

Colonist (The X-Files), a type of extraterrestrial creature that appears in the television series The X-Files and the feature film The X-Files
Colonist (1861), a British schooner launched in 1861 and sunk in 1890
Colonist car, a type of railway passenger coach designed to provide inexpensive long-distant transportation for immigrants
The Colonist, a newspaper published in Sydney, Australia, from 1835 to 1840
Colonists, an EP by Nero's Day at Disneyland
The Colonist, a newspaper published in Nelson, New Zealand, from 1857 to 1920

See also
 Colonial (disambiguation)
 Colonialism
 Colonization
 Colony